Decanter is an outdoor 1987 sculpture by Frank Stella, installed at the Museum of Fine Arts, Houston's Lillie and Hugh Roy Cullen Sculpture Garden in the U.S. state of Texas. It is made of stainless steel, bronze, and carbon steel, and was purchased using monetary contributions from the Alice Pratt Brown Museum Fund. According to the museum, the piece "offers a exuberant collage of forms which bursts out into space".

See also

 1987 in art
 List of public art in Houston

References

1987 establishments in Texas
1987 sculptures
Bronze sculptures in Texas
Lillie and Hugh Roy Cullen Sculpture Garden
Steel sculptures in Texas
Stainless steel sculptures in the United States